Armenochori may refer to the following places:

Armenochori, Cyprus, a village in the Limassol district, Cyprus
Armenochori, Greece, a village in the Florina regional unit, Greece